Chester C. Dillon (January 14, 1887 – October 11, 1972) was an American football player, coach of football, basketball, and baseball, and college athletics administrator. He served as the head football coach at Dakota Wesleyan University (1915–1916), Simpson College (1916–1917), Howard College in Homewood, Alabama—now known as Samford University (1919, 1927–1928), Oshkosh State Normal School—now known as the University of Wisconsin–Oshkosh (1920), Georgetown College in Georgetown, Kentucky (1929–1930), and Jacksonville State Teachers College—now known as Jacksonville State University (1938–1939, 1945). Dillon was born on January 14, 1887, in Normal, Illinois. He died on October 11, 1972.

Head coaching record

Football

References

1887 births
1972 deaths
American football halfbacks
Basketball coaches from Illinois
Dakota Wesleyan Tigers baseball coaches
Dakota Wesleyan Tigers football coaches
Georgetown Tigers football coaches
Georgetown Tigers men's basketball coaches
Illinois Fighting Illini football players
Illinois State Redbirds football players
Jacksonville State Gamecocks football coaches
Samford Bulldogs athletic directors
Samford Bulldogs baseball coaches
Samford Bulldogs men's basketball coaches
Samford Bulldogs football coaches
Simpson Storm football coaches
Simpson Storm men's basketball coaches
Wisconsin–Oshkosh Titans football coaches
People from Normal, Illinois
Players of American football from Illinois